The Reprieve (Spanish: El indulto) is a 1961 Spanish drama film directed by José Luis Sáenz de Heredia and starring Pedro Armendáriz, Concha Velasco and Manuel Monroy.

The film's sets were designed by Sigfrido Burmann.

Cast

References

Bibliography 
 Bentley, Bernard. A Companion to Spanish Cinema. Boydell & Brewer, 2008.

External links 
 

1961 drama films
Spanish drama films
1961 films
1960s Spanish-language films
Films directed by José Luis Sáenz de Heredia
1960s Spanish films